Sandra Thalmann (born 18 December 1992) is a Swiss ice hockey player.

International career
Thalmann was selected for the Switzerland national women's ice hockey team in the 2010 Winter Olympics. She played in all five games, but did not register a point.

Thalmann has also appeared for Switzerland at four IIHF Women's World Championships. Her first appearance came in 2009. She was a member of the bronze medal-winning team at the 2012 championships.

Thalmann made two appearances for the Switzerland women's national under-18 ice hockey team at the IIHF World Women's U18 Championships. Her first came in 2008.

Career statistics

References

External links

Sports-Reference Profile

1992 births
Living people
Ice hockey players at the 2010 Winter Olympics
Ice hockey players at the 2014 Winter Olympics
Medalists at the 2014 Winter Olympics
Olympic bronze medalists for Switzerland
Olympic ice hockey players of Switzerland
Olympic medalists in ice hockey
Sportspeople from Basel-Stadt
Swiss women's ice hockey forwards
21st-century Swiss women